The King is a 1995 Indian Malayalam-language political action thriller film written by Renji Panicker and directed by Shaji Kailas, with Mammootty in the lead role as district collector Joseph Alex IAS. 

The film was released on October 23 1995, coinciding with Diwali, where it was declared one of the highest grossing Malayalam film of all time.

Plot
The city of Kozhikode has been victimized by a massive communal riot against the slums, costing the lives of 12 civilians. Before the riot happened, a wildlife photographer named Madhu Kumar witnessed a group of criminals transporting explosives through the local forest check post, so he calls up the local police commissioner Shankar and passes on the information. However, the goons managed to capture and murder Madhu to cover their tracks. 

While helping the police to fight against the rioters, the aggressive yet honorable DC Thevalliparambil Joseph Alex is suspicious of Shankar's activities and decides to investigate the case with the help from his subordinates ASP Prasad and AC Anura Mukherji, who admires Joseph for his honesty and aggressive behaviour against corrupt officials and politicians. Joseph is brought over to a personal hearing with the state minister John Varghese, who berates him over his behavior while attempting to stop the riots. However, Joseph stands up by reprimanding Varghese for his belief in using his authority to belittle and harass others. 

Meanwhile, Madhu's father reaches out to Prasad after filing a case regarding to Madhu's disappearance, resulting Prasad to finally discover Madhu's corpse with his camera, though the film is missing. As the investigation heats up, MP Jayakrishnan is assisting in relief works in the damaged area by meeting the aggrieved entities after his arrival from Delhi. However, it turns out that Jayakrishnan is the mastermind behind the massacre as he planned the riot against the slums to plan a new real estate business in the area. It is revealed that the people involved in the conspiracy are Varghese, Ibrahim Jalal and Shankar, as the latter sent up the goons to murder Madhu to cover their tracks. 

The local police medical surgeon Dr. Vijay, who has conducted the autopsy on Madhu's body, deduces that Madhu was murdered, but he ends up dying in a road accident. Eventually, Joseph finds a new ally named Sanjay, who happens to be Vijay's younger brother and a close buddy of Joseph during his Mussourie training days. Joseph, along with Sanjay and Prasad, finds out that Dr. Vijay was injected with a powerful drug by the same goons who murdered Madhu, which could have contributed to the accident. While Jayakrishnan flies back to Delhi to accept his new job as a cabinet minister in the central government, Joseph arrests and interrogates Jalal, who reveals that the lead goon Ananthashankara Iyer is responsible for murdering Madhu and Dr. Vijay. 

After arresting Iyer at a shopping mall, Joseph uses the same sedative to force Iyer into giving out important information about the conspiracy behind the communal riot. Before Joseph and Prasad could escort Iyer to the police station, Iyer's boss Vikram Khorpade, a Mumbai-based crime boss, who has strong ties with Jayakrishnan and being a major player in the conspiracy, arrives and causes a shootout that allowed him to rescue Iyer. Vikram also takes the opportunity to murder Anura before fleeing away with Iyer, much to Joseph's shock. 

Declaring this personal, Joseph, Prasad, and Sanjay track down Vikram and his goons to a horse farm, where they kill all of the goons residing there. After Sanjay kills Iyer by hanging him on a chain, Joseph beats up Vikram before taking him into custody, forcing him to reveal the identities of the people behind the conspiracy. Following his return after being sworn as the new cabinet minister, Jayakrishnan is met by an angry Joseph and several officers. Joseph takes the opportunity to expose Jayakrishnan's conspiracy plot to the public, using both Iyer and Vikram's confessions as proof of his findings. 

As a result, Jayakrishnan is placed under arrest for conspiracy and murder while Shankar is suspended and arrested by his own officers for the same charges. Jayakrishnan refuses to concede defeat and instead takes one of the officers's guns before firing at the crowd, murdering Vikram and several citizens in the process. Jayakrishnan uses the commotion to make a getaway in a car, only for Joseph to shoot the gas tank, causing the car to explode and kill Jayakrishnan. Joseph is then hailed as a hero by the public for his actions.

Cast

Mammootty as District Collector Thevalliparambil Joseph Alex IAS
Murali as MP Jayakrishnan
Vani Viswanath as Assistant Collector Anura Mukharji IAS
Vijayaraghavan as Sanjay
K. B. Ganesh Kumar as ACP Prasad IPS
Devan as City Police Commissioner Shankar Ramadas IPS
Kuthiravattam Pappu as Krishnan
Rajan P. Dev as Govinda Menon
K. P. A. C. Azeez as Kandakuzhi Thankachan
Kollam Thulasi as Minister John Varghese
C. I. Paul as DYSP Chacko
Appa Haja as Madhu
 Sonia as Alexander's Daughter
Thikkurissy Sukumaran Nair as Madhu's Father
Kunchan as Kurup
Vijay Menon as Dr. Vijay
Sadiq as Ibrahim Jalal
Kazan Khan as Vikram Ghorpade
T. S. Krishnan as Ananthashankara Iyer
Prof. Aliyar
Bindu Panicker as Jayakrishnan's Wife
Ragini as Shankar's Wife
Manju Satheesh as Madhu's Sister
Poojappura Radhakrishnan as Pillai's PA

Cameo appearance 
Suresh Gopi as Bharathchandran IPS 
M. G. Soman as Alexander Thevalliparambil, Joseph's father 
K. P. A. C. Lalitha as Joseph's mother 
Sankaradi as Pillai 
Maniyanpilla Raju as Collector's assistant 
K. P. A. C. Sunny as Sulaiman

Release
The King was released on 11 November 1995.

Box office 
It ran over 200 days in theatres and was the  highest grossing Malayalam film of all time.

Sequel
In 2012, Shaji Kailas made a combined sequel titled The King and the Commissioner, in which Mammootty and Suresh Gopi reprised their roles as Joseph Alex IAS and Bharathchandran IPS, but the sequel was panned by critics and became a box-office bomb.

References

External links 
 
 The King at Pixslate

1990s Malayalam-language films
1995 action thriller films
1995 films
1990s political thriller films
TheKingCommi2
Films directed by Shaji Kailas
Indian political thriller films
Indian action thriller films
Fictional portrayals of the Kerala Police